Charles Norris (December 4, 1867 – September 11, 1935) was New York's first appointed chief medical examiner (1918–1935) and pioneer of forensic toxicology in America.

Early life

Norris was born on December 4, 1867.  He was first educated at Cutler's Private School in Manhattan, later entering Yale University and earning a bachelor of philosophy with emphasis on science.  He then went to the Columbia University College of Physicians and Surgeons, earning a doctorate in medicine in 1892.  After studying for four years in Europe, he returned to New York, and in 1904 became the laboratory director at Bellevue and Allied Hospitals.

Medical examiner
In 1917, Norris, applying for the job of Chief Medical Examiner of the City of New York, took a civil service examination and passed.  Mayor John F. Hylan immediately took legal action against him, claiming that in performing autopsies as part of the examination he had violated the law.  Fortunately for Norris, the state government took notice and intervened, forcing Hylan to appoint Norris chief medical examiner.

Norris immediately set about improving his department.  After hiring several distinguished scientists and chemists, including Alexander Gettler, he was forced, due to the lack of any supplies, to buy them all out of his own money.  Other problems included the possibility of his workers being drafted to serve in the army (which he solved by writing to Hylan), and the low salaries of his workers, which averaged less than $4,000 a year (approximately $ today).

Tetraethyl lead and the "looney gas building"

In 1924, Norris was called in to investigate the mysterious insanity and deaths of workers in a plant that made tetraethyllead.  It was mostly made in Standard Oil's plant at the Bayway Refinery in New Jersey. TEL was compounded in a small red brick building which was soon nicknamed the "looney gas building", due to the insanity of the workers there.  Although Standard Oil had tried to deny that the deaths were due to tetraethyllead, New Jersey ordered the plant shut down.  Although a federal investigation, by chemical industry scientists, responded to the concerns by recommending certain safety measures be adopted by production workers, it concluded that the risk posed to the public was low and the plant resumed production soon afterwards.  It was not until 1978 that the leaded gasoline was banned.

Carbon monoxide poisoning

In December 1926, Francesco Travia was caught carrying parts of Anna Fredericksen's body towards the Brooklyn waterfront in New York city. Detectives found the remains of Fredericksen's dismembered body in Travia's apartment and charged him with murder. Travia claimed he and the victim had fallen asleep after drinking whiskey in his apartment, and that after waking up he found her dead on the floor.  Dr. Norris concluded that the victim had died of carbon monoxide poisoning and could not have been killed by Travia.  The police department ignored the conclusions of Norris and charged Travia with murder.  At Travia's trial in March, 1927, the forensic analysis of Norris and chemist Alexander Gettler proved carbon monoxide gas from Travia's stove had poisoned her to death.  Travia was acquitted of murder, convicted instead of illegally dismembering a dead body.

Advisory Board of the Association Against Impure Liquor
On February 12, 1927, Norris was elected to the chairmanship of the Advisory Board of the Association Against Impure Liquor.  The purpose of the
organization was to organize physicians, hospital administrators, and pharmacists who "realize the necessity of purity of liquors
administered to the sick."

Death
In the spring of 1935, Norris began to feel ill.  He began staying away from public events.  That summer, he took a vacation to South America, hoping to improve his health.  Once he returned in late August, his health steadily deteriorated.  He died at 8:30 p.m. on September 11, 1935, of heart failure.

References

External links 
 American doctors of destiny. By Frank Joseph Jirka
 The Chemist's War

1867 births
1935 deaths
Columbia University Vagelos College of Physicians and Surgeons alumni
Yale University alumni
American forensic scientists
Persons involved with death and dying
Coroners of New York County, New York
Chief Medical Examiners of the City of New York
Scientists from New York (state)